The Roman Forum of Thessaloniki is the ancient Roman-era forum of the city, located at the upper side of Aristotelous Square.

It is a large two-terraced forum featuring two-storey stoas, dug up by accident in the 1960s. The forum complex also boasts two Roman baths, one of which has been excavated while the other is buried underneath the city, and a small theater which was also used for gladiatorial games. Although the initial complex was not built in Roman times, it was largely refurbished in the 2nd century. It is believed that the forum and the theater continued to be used until at least the 6th century.

The area of the forum was planned to be the site of the Thessaloniki Municipal Courthouse (in Greek: Δικαστικό Μέγαρο), but after the ruins were discovered during the excavation, the project was scrapped. While the courthouse building was relocated, the intended name of the square ("Courthouse/Dikastirion Square") still survives in popular use. The official name of the square however is "of Ancient Agora (Archaias Agoras)".

Gallery

Notes

Ancient Roman forums
Roman Thessalonica
Buildings and structures in Thessaloniki
Squares in Greece
Tourist attractions in Thessaloniki
Ancient Roman buildings and structures in Greece